The Pierce–Hichborn House (circa 1711) is an early Georgian house located at 29 North Square, Boston, Massachusetts. It is immediately adjacent to the Paul Revere House and is now operated as a nonprofit museum by the Paul Revere Memorial Association. An admission fee is charged.

Design 
The Pierce–Hichborn House is three stories tall, faced in common-bond brickwork with decorative belt courses and large sash windows. Its narrow side elevation faces the street, with its main facade opening onto a compact private passageway. Inside it is laid out on each floor as a narrow central hallway and stairway with a single heated room to either side. Framing is oak and the trim is pine, including fireplace mantels. Originally each room had two front-facing windows and two side windows although later extensions to the side of the house farthest from the street eliminated those side windows. The house is not rectangular and its street-side corner is very sharp to take full advantage of the small urban lot.

History 
The original dwelling was probably destroyed in the 1711 Boston fire. The house is an excellent example of early Georgian architecture and one of the earliest surviving brick structures in Boston. It was built by glazier Moses Pierce, the grandson of John Jeffs, who built the neighboring Paul Revere House thirty years earlier. Even then the neighborhood was urban, and the house stood three doors down the square from the Revere House. William Shippard purchased the house in 1747. Nathaniel Hichborn, a boatbuilder and cousin of Paul Revere, acquired the house from Shippard in 1781. The Hutchinson family lived in the house until 1864. It became a tenement and store until the early 1940s.

In 1941, the Society for the Preservation of New England Antiquities bought the house at a bank auction. In 1949, descendants of Hichborn led an effort to restore the house. The house was named a National Historic Landmark by the National Park Service on November 24, 1968. As per procedure, the house was also listed on the National Register of Historic Places. In 1970, ownership was turned over to the Paul Revere Memorial Association, who operate the house as a museum in conjunction with the Revere house.

See also 
 List of National Historic Landmarks in Boston
 National Register of Historic Places listings in northern Boston, Massachusetts

References

Further reading
 Ross, Marjorie Drake. Book of Boston: The Colonial Period, 1630–1775. NY: Hastings House, 1960.
 Eldredge, Joseph. Architecture Boston. Barre, MA: Barre Publishing, 1976.
 "Pierce/Hichborn house: a new look at an old landmark," Alliance Letter, May 1983, pp. 5, 10–11.
 "Paul Revere and Moses Pierce–Hichborn houses in Boston," Antiques, Feb. 1984.
 Vila, Bob. Bob Vila's Guide to Historic Homes of New England. NY: Lintel Press, 1993.
 "Three days in Boston," Interiors, April 2000, pp. 75–76.

External links

Pierce/Hichborne House

Houses completed in 1711
Houses in Boston
Historic house museums in Massachusetts
Museums in Boston
National Historic Landmarks in Boston
North End, Boston
Houses on the National Register of Historic Places in Suffolk County, Massachusetts
1711 establishments in Massachusetts
National Register of Historic Places in Boston